Smrečany is a village and municipality in Liptovský Mikuláš District in the Žilina Region of northern Slovakia.

History
In historical records the village was first mentioned in 1272.

Geography
The municipality lies at an altitude of 718 metres and covers an area of 8.046 km². It has a population of about 621 people.

References

External links

  Official page
http://www.statistics.sk/mosmis/eng/run.html

Villages and municipalities in Liptovský Mikuláš District